Kanran, or Karan, was an Alaafin of the Oyo Empire. He succeeded Oba Odarawu. 

He was considered a fierce and tempestuous leader, and is said to have subjected his subjects to severe punishments. He inspired the Oyo proverb, 'O nika ninu ju Karan lo' ('He is more cruel than Karan').

As a result of his propensity to harm his own people, a plot to terminate him or get him to abdicate the throne was entered into by his nobles. He was rejected by the Oyo Mesi (the principal counselors of the state) but defied the subsequent pressure to commit suicide. When the army entered his city, Kanran reportedly climbed onto the roof of his palace and shot arrows at them until the building was set on fire.

He was succeeded by his son Jayin.

A Series Of Excerpts From The Oral Records Of Oyo

References

Samuel Johnson, Obadiah Johnson. The History of the Yorubas: From the  Earliest Times to the Beginning of the British Protectorate. p 170

Alaafins of Oyo